Turíbio Ruiz (September 26, 1929 – July 25, 2020) was a Brazilian actor, television presenter, and radio presenter. His career as an actor and broadcaster spanned from the late 1940s to the early 2010s.

Biography
Ruiz was born in Poá, São Paulo state. His father, Ramon Ruiz Lopes, had settled in Poá after immigrating to Brazil from Spain. Turíbio Ruiz's siblings included Ramon Ruiz Lopes Filho, a journalist.

Ruiz's career began as an announcer and broadcaster for Rádio Marabá in the late 1940s. He also worked as a radio and television broadcaster based in Mogi das Cruzes, São Paulo state. Additionally, he appeared as a voice actor in Brazilian films and television series.

Ruiz provided the Brazilian Portuguese voice performances for many foreign-language films, notably the roles of John the Baptist (Andre Gregory) in Martin Scorsese's The Last Temptation of Christ (1988) and Cole Carlin (Anthony James) in the 1974 film, High Plains Drifter, starring Clint Eastwood.

Ruiz's last credit was the Rede Globo telenovela in 2010. He portrayed Ruriá Karuê, an Indigenous Brazilian character, opposite Cléo Pires and Juca de Oliveira in the series.

Turíbio Ruiz died from a stroke in the city of São Paulo on July 25, 2020, at the age of 90. He was buried in the Municipal Cemetery of Poá, the city where he was born in 1929.

Ruiz had been married twice, including to the late actress , who died in 2004. He had three children.

Filmography

Television

Films

References

External links

1929 births
2020 deaths
Brazilian television actors
Brazilian telenovela actors
Brazilian film actors
Brazilian male voice actors
Brazilian radio personalities
Brazilian people of Spanish descent